The Templiers de Sénart are a team in Division Élite. They were founded in 1987 as the Baseball Club of Melun-Sénart, moved up to Division Élite in 1998, were relegated back down, but returned in 2003. In 2007, they finished second in Division Élite behind the Rouen Huskies.

External links
 

Division Élite teams
Baseball teams established in 1987
1987 establishments in France